The voiced velar lateral approximant is a type of consonantal sound, used as a distinct consonant in a very small number of spoken languages in the world. The symbol in the International Phonetic Alphabet that represents this sound is  a small capital version of the Latin letter l (since 1989), and the equivalent X-SAMPA symbol is L\.

The velar laterals of the world often involve a prestopped realization .

Features
Features of the voiced velar lateral approximant:

The velar lateral  involves no contact of the tip of the tongue with the roof of the mouth: just like for the velar stop , the only contact takes place between the back of the tongue and the velum. This contrasts with the velarized alveolar lateral approximant  – also known as the dark l in English feel  – for which the apex touches the alveolar ridge.

Occurrence

See also
Voiceless velar lateral approximant, 
Velarized alveolar lateral approximant, 
Voiceless alveolar lateral fricative, 
Velar lateral tap, 
Voiced velar lateral fricative, 
Voiceless velar lateral fricative, 
Index of phonetics articles

Notes

References

External links
 

Lateral consonants
Velar consonants
Pulmonic consonants
Voiced oral consonants